Matheus Gonçalves is a Brazilian footballer who plays as a midfielder for Flamengo.

The name may also refer to:

 Matheus Trindade - a Brazilian footballer, whose full name is Matheus Trindade Gonçalves.
 Matheus Sávio - a Brazlian footballer, whose full name is Matheus Gonçalves Savio.